Sultan Ibrahim Shah ibni Almarhum Sultan Salehuddin Shah (Jawi: سلطان إبراهيم شاه ابن المرحوم سلطان صالح الدين شاه ; born Raja Ibrahim bin Raja Lumu; c. 1736 – 27 October 1826) was the second Sultan of Selangor. He served as sultan from 1778 until his death in 1826. He was known as a strong energetic ruler and an Anglophile. Despite building the Kota Melawati fort to protect the area, on 13 July 1784, the Dutch captured Kuala Selangor and ended up deposing and exiling him. Sultan Ibrahim recaptured the fort in a daring raid in 1785 with help from Pahang. Later in his reign, in 1818, Selangor began political relations with the United Kingdom. Contemporary writer Thomas Newbold (1807–1850) mentions that after his successor Muhammad Shah took the throne, the territory lapsed into comparative decay, where Ibrahim's offspring committed piracy, robberies and levied contributions from the local inhabitants, which then lead to emigration.

References

Ibrahim Shah
Malaysian people of Malay descent
1736 births
Malaysian people of Bugis descent
1826 deaths
18th-century monarchs in Asia
19th-century monarchs in Asia